Mongoy is a rural locality (a settlement) in Bauntovsky District, Republic of Buryatia, Russia. The population was 205 as of 2010. There are 8 streets.

Geography 
Mongoy is located by the Amalat river in the Vitim Plateau, 80 km southeast of Bagdarin (the district's administrative centre).

References 

Rural localities in Bauntovsky District